On 31 July 2019, a roadside bomb killed 34 civilians and injured another 17 who were on a bus in Farah Province, Afghanistan. President Ashraf Ghani's spokesman confirmed that the perpetrators were the Taliban.

The bombing 
On 31 July 2019, at 8am, a high explosive bomb attack was carried out on a passenger bus on the Herat-Kandahar highway in Farah, western Afghanistan, bordering Iran. The roadside IED killed 34 passengers. Another 17 people were injured after the explosive device detonated. The victims and injured were all defenseless civilians, most of them women and children.

Claims of responsibility, motivation   
No group has claimed responsibility, but the Taliban is the only extremist group known to operate in the area and frequently uses IEDs in attacks. The bloodshed took place in the midst of efforts to conclude a US peace agreement with the Taliban, presumably to strengthen their negotiating position through deterrence.

References 

2019 murders in Afghanistan
July 2019 bombing
21st-century mass murder in Afghanistan
Bus bombings in Asia
July 2019 bombing
Improvised explosive device bombings in 2019
Islamic terrorist incidents in 2019
July 2019 crimes in Asia
July 2019 events in Afghanistan
Mass murder in 2019
Taliban bombings
Terrorist incidents in Afghanistan in 2019